The Other Man's Wife is a 1919 American silent drama film directed by Carl Harbaugh which, as discussed in its prologue, is dedicated to the part played by women at home during World War I. It was the film debut of George Jessel. The film is considered to be lost.

Plot
As described in a film magazine, the wartime draft affects three families, one wealthy, one on the East Side, and the other a middle-class family. In the wealthy home a man leaves his butterfly wife and three children, in the middle class home a youth leaves his mother and sister, and in the East Side home a boy leaves his parents and three sisters, the men all marching off to training camp. While they are away, J. Douglas Kerr (Holmes) is the lounge lizard interloper who endeavors to win the affections of the wife of the wealthy Fred Hartley, stooping so low as to send a cablegram suggesting the death of the husband. While she is less of the butterfly than he supposes, she apparently succumbs to his attentions, and he believes he will obtain some money marrying her. But after the armistice ends the fighting, the men begin to come home to their families. Fred Hartley comes home to find his wife in Kerr's arms, where she is struggling to free herself, saying to Kerr that she was wise to his low tactics all along, but had to use a woman's weapons. In this tense scene Fred initially refuses to respond to his wife's embrace, but later matters logically work themselves out for a happy reunion of all families.

Cast 
 Ellen Cassidy as Mrs. Fred Hartley
 Stuart Holmes as J. Douglas Kerr
 Ned Hay as Fred Hartley
 Olive Trevor as Elsie Drummond
 Halbert Brown as Bruce Drummond
 Elizabeth Garrison as Mrs. Bruce Drummond (as Mrs. Garrison)
 Leslie Casey as Wilbur Drummond
 Regina Quinn as Betty Moore
 Laura Newman as Mrs. Moore
 Danny Sullivan as Jimmy Moore
 George Jessel as Davy Simon
 Evelyn Brent as Becky Simon

References

External links

1919 films
1919 drama films
Silent American drama films
American silent feature films
American black-and-white films
Films directed by Carl Harbaugh
Lost American films
Lost drama films
1919 lost films
1910s American films